New York State Route 289 (NY 289) is a north–south state highway in Jefferson County, New York, in the United States. The southern terminus of the route is at NY 193 in the village of Ellisburg near the center of the town of Ellisburg. Its northern terminus is at NY 178 in the extreme southwestern corner of the town of Adams.

Route description
NY 289 begins in the village of Ellisburg at a junction with NY 193. It travels north through the small village on Main Street, then enters the surrounding town of Ellisburg. The route heads onward through open fields to the hamlet of Belleville. Here, NY 289 intersects with County Route 75 (CR 75). CR 75 enters the hamlet from the west and exits to the north while NY 289 continues to the northeast, following Sandy Creek. Before exiting Belleville, NY 289 passes the back road to Belleville–Henderson Central School.

History
The entirety of NY 289 was assigned as part of the 1930 renumbering of state highways in New York.

Major intersections

See also

References

External links

289
Transportation in Jefferson County, New York